Glebula rotundata, the round pearlshell, is a freshwater mussel, aquatic bivalve mollusks in the family Unionidae. The only species in the genus Glebula, it is unusual among unionoid mussels in that it can tolerate brackish water.

It is found on the drainages of the Gulf Coast, as well as in Arkansas and Oklahoma.

References

Unionidae
Bivalve genera
Monotypic mollusc genera